Anshika Sharma (born July 11, 1996) is a Nepali-Australian beauty pageant titleholder who was crowned Miss Universe Nepal 2020. She represented Nepal at Miss Universe 2020. She worked as a sales analyst and was the runner-up at Miss Nepal Oceania 2020.

Life and career

Early life
Anshika Sharma was born in Jhapa and raised in Kathmandu by her parents, Balkrishna and Mala Sharma. She is a sales analyst and dancer. She also has an interest in photography. After graduating high school in Kathmandu, she moved to Sydney, Australia, for her higher education. Sharma financed her education and completed her bachelor's degree in Informational Technology from Central Queensland University, after which she worked as a sales/business analyst for DHL.

Pageantry
On March 14, 2020, Sharma entered a major regional pageant, "Miss Nepal Oceania 2020 Pageant". She was the fourth candidate in the competition. Sharma was the runner-up in the competition and was awarded the title of Miss Popular Choice during the coronation night held at the Orion Function Center in Sydney. Later that year, she competed in Miss Universe Nepal 2020 and won the first-ever Miss Universe Nepal pageant. In an interview, she revealed that irrespective of the titles, all those moments were of pride, as she was representing Nepal on international platforms. During Miss Universe Nepal 2020, she won the title of Miss Fierce. She represented Nepal at Miss Universe 2020 in Hollywood, Florida, and was one of the favored delegates to win the crown of Miss Universe 2020.

Charity Work
Sharma is a founder of the non-profit organization Anshika Education Welfare Foundation (AEWF), which supports under privilege children from minority groups and orphanages in rural communities of Nepal. Sharma believes education is the only way to get ahead and make someone's life bright. The foundation supports children financially and provides school fees, clothes, study materials, nutritious food, accommodation, travel, and pay their medical expenses. The organization also focuses on supporting girls and handling their health-related issues.

References

External links
Miss Nepal Website
Miss Universe Website
Miss Universe Nepal Website
Miss Universe Nepal on Facebook

Living people
1997 births
Miss Nepal winners
Nepalese beauty pageant winners
Miss Universe 2020 contestants
People from Jhapa District